Dauphin William Osgood (Chinese:  or ; Pinyin: Kē Wéiliáng; Foochow Romanized: Kŏ̤ Ùi-liòng; November 5, 1845—August 17, 1880) was an American Board medical missionary to China.

Life
Dr. Dauphin William Osgood was born on November 5, 1845, in Nelson, New Hampshire, United States. In 1866 he study medicine in Bowdoin's Medical School, and later in New York University where he received his M.D. in 1869.

After a short period of practice in his native town, Osgood came with his wife Helen W. Osgood to China as a medical missionary, arriving at Foochow on January 22, 1870. Upon his arrival he began practicing medicine part-time, while putting much of his energy in the study of the Chinese and the Foochow vernacular, and very soon he mastered the language. He established the Foochow Medical Missionary Hospital near Ponasang, where he devoted much of his energy. In 1878 a new fifty-bed hospital at the Peace Street was completed with funds contributed by foreign businessmen and Chinese merchants and officials in Foochow, and the old building was turned into an opium asylum.

Osgood worked in Foochow for a little more than a decade until his own health broke down in the summer of 1880. During his ten years of labor he had given medical aid to 51,838 patients and about 1,500 opium smokers. On August 17, 1880, Osgood died of sunstroke at a sanitarium on Sharp Peak Island near the mouth of River Min. The day before his death he completed a five-volume translation of a standard work on anatomy into Chinese.

Grave
Dr. Osgood was buried in the American Mission Cemetery in Foochow, near the corner of the grounds and close to the wall at the right of the cemetery gate. There was a white marble cross at the head, and the grave was surrounded by a black iron chain set in a low granite base. The English inscription on his tombstone read:
In the cross of Christ I glory
Dauphin William Osgood
Arrived at Foochow January 22, 1870
Died at Sharp Peak August 17, 1880
Erected by the foreign community of Foochow as a token of respects.

On the opposite side of the base stone was a quotation from Jeremiah 49:11,
Leave thy fatherless children. I will preserve them alive, and let the widows trust in me.

The Foochow Mission Cemetery was destroyed during Cultural Revolution.

References

1845 births
1880 deaths
People from Nelson, New Hampshire
American Congregationalist missionaries
Congregationalist missionaries in China
Christian missionaries in Fujian
Physicians from New Hampshire
Christian medical missionaries
American expatriates in China
19th-century American translators
Bowdoin College alumni
New York University Grossman School of Medicine alumni
Missionary linguists